Aarish Kumar (born 19 May 1999) is a Singaporean footballer currently playing as a midfielder for Balestier Khalsa.

Club

Warriors FC
Aarish make his debut in 2019 for the Warriors against Tampines Rovers.

Balestier Khalsa
After Warriors FC was expelled for the 2020 season, Aarish joins the Tigers.  His contract is extended for 2021.

Career statistics

Notes

References

1999 births
Living people
Singaporean footballers
Association football defenders
Singapore Premier League players
Hougang United FC players
Young Lions FC players
Singapore youth international footballers
Singaporean sportspeople of Indian descent